Hamiri or Homiri may refer to:
 Hamiri, Hormozgan
 Hamiri, Sistan and Baluchestan